A by-election was held for the New South Wales Legislative Assembly electorate of Ashfield on 26 September 1899 because Bernhard Wise had been appointed Attorney General. Until 1904, members appointed to a ministerial position were required to face a by-election. These were generally uncontested. Of the nine ministers appointed with the formation of Lyne ministry, Ashfield and Hume (William Lyne) were the only electorates in which the by-election was contested.

Dates

Result

Bernhard Wise had been appointed Attorney General.

See also
Electoral results for the district of Ashfield

References

1899 elections in Australia
New South Wales state by-elections
1890s in New South Wales